Leonards Pond, also known as Leonard's Pond, is a  pond in Rochester, Massachusetts. The pond is located west of Mary's Pond. The confluence of the west and east branches of the Sippican River is at this pond, and the Sippican River continues as the outflow.

External links
Environmental Protection Agency

Ponds of Plymouth County, Massachusetts
Rochester, Massachusetts
Ponds of Massachusetts